Slatina is a municipality and village in Ústí nad Orlicí District in the Pardubice Region of the Czech Republic. It has about 500 inhabitants.

References

Villages in Ústí nad Orlicí District